Thanh Minh is a commune (xã) of Điện Biên Phủ in Điện Biên Province, northwestern Vietnam.

Communes of Điện Biên province
Geography of Điện Biên province
Dien Bien Phu